Semyon Petrovich Gudzenko (born Sario Gudzenko; 5 March 1922, in Kyiv – 2 December 1953, in Moscow) was a Soviet Russian poet of Ukrainian-Jewish origin, of the World War II generation. He is often compared with Pavel Kogan and Semen Kirsanov.

He died from old war wounds as he himself predicted in one of his own poems.

Gudzenko studied at the Moscow Institute of History, Philosophy, and Literature during 1939–41. He developed as a poet during the years of the Great Patriotic War. His first anthology, Regiment Comrades (1944), sounded the courageous voice of an ordinary participant in great events, one who knows the harsh truth of war. The narrative poem The Remote Garrison(1950) tells of the everyday working life of the Soviet Army in peace time. Gudzenko is the author of the anthologies After theMarch (1947), Transcarpathian Verses (1948), and the cycle of poems Train to Tuva (1949).

Awards: Medal "For the Victory over Germany in the Great Patriotic War 1941–1945", Order of the Red Star, Order of the Patriotic War 2nd class, Medal "For the Defence of Moscow", Medal "For the Capture of Budapest".

References

External links
Semyon Gudzenko. Poems (in Russian)
Verses of Semyon Gudzenko in transl. by V.V.Vald
A poem by Semyon Gudzenko translated by Victor Rivas

Soviet poets
Russian male poets
Soviet male writers
20th-century Russian male writers
Ukrainian poets
Russian people of Ukrainian descent
Ukrainian people of World War II
1922 births
1953 deaths
20th-century Russian poets
Russian-language poets
Ukrainian poets in Russian